Abatar ("The Incarnation") also known as Avatar is a 1941 Indian Bengali mythological social drama film directed by Premankur Atorthy. The film was produced by Sree Bharat Lakshmi Pictures. The music of the film was composed by Himangshu Dutta, who is referred to as Surasagar Himangshu Dutta. He made use of Rabindra Sangeet in his compositions and helped familiarize S. D. Burman to its use in composing semi-classical songs. The cast included Durgadas Bannerjee, Ahindra Choudhury, Jyotsna Gupta, Tulsi Lahiri, Utpal Sen and Panna Devi. The film is a mythological rendering along with satire of modern society and rapid extension of generation through industrialization,  economy and modern politics during second world war. The story of the film tells about King Indranath's misfortunes and the descent to earth of gods incarnated as humans.

Plot
Indranath's son is ill, Guru Omkarananda suggests he pray to the goddess Kamala. His son improves but bad luck follows Indranath; his son and daughter die. Unable to stand the grief the Queen/Kalyani loses her mental equilibrium. Goddess Kamala manifests as Rupasi, the daughter of Omkarananda.  Virodhananda and his son Tribhanga are the incarnation of Narad and Narayan on earth. The kingdom goes through difficult times. Omkarananda is arrested and Rupasi goes to meet Bastabesh/Indranath who is attracted to her. Rupasi takes refuge in  Birodhananda's house to avoid Bastabesh's advances.  Birodhananda is interested in getting his son Tribhanga married to Rupasi.  Bastabesh goes after Rupasi/Kamala who blinds him. Finally the gods perform their miracle and a repentant Bastabesh is restored his sight and kingdom.

Cast
Durgadas Bannerjee as Narayan/Tribhanga
Ahindra Choudhury as Indranath/Bastavesh
Jyotsna Gupta as Kamala/Rupasi
Tulsi Lahiri as Narad/Birodhananda
Bhumen Roy as Bhishwakarma/Jantraraj
Utpal Sen as Omkarananda
Renuka Roy as Maya
Panna Devi as Kalyani/Rani
Kamla Jharia as singer
Santosh Singha
Nitish Mukhopadhyay
Satya Mukhopadhyay as laatai
Kartik Roy

Music
The music of 'Abatar' composed by 'Rabindra Sangeet' music director Himangshu Dutta, use 'Rabindra Sangeet' Elements to compose the film songs.

References

External links

1941 films
Bengali-language Indian films
1940s Bengali-language films
Films directed by Premankur Atorthy
Indian drama films
Indian black-and-white films
1941 drama films